Nye Bevan House, was a large office development on the corner of Elmbank Crescent and India Street in Glasgow, Scotland. It formed part of the complex of buildings known as Strathclyde House which collectively served as the offices and meeting place of Strathclyde Regional Council until it was abolished in 1996.

History
India Street was previously occupied by a terrace of Georgian style houses which included a well-appointed hotel known as "More's Hotel", whose visitors included, in summer 1937, the American conductor and composer, George Szell. India Street was substantially redeveloped in the early 1970s as part of a wider initiative to redevelop the Charing Cross area to make way for the M8 motorway. 

The building was designed by E. S. Boyer & Partners in the Modern style, built in dark brick and glass and was completed in 1974. The design involved a main frontage facing India Street with another shorter wing extending eastwards along Elmbank Crescent. The main frontage was faced with alternating bands of dark brick and steel-framed windows and the building ranged in height up to nine storeys. The building was initially called "Viceroy House".

Strathclyde House

Strathclyde Regional Council was created in 1975. The council initially rented offices called Melrose House at 19 Cadogan Street in Glasgow to act as an interim headquarters pending a decision being taken on a permanent headquarters. Various other offices around the centre of Glasgow were also used for additional office space, including Viceroy House and other modern buildings near it on India Street. In 1976, the nearby former Glasgow High School buildings on Elmbank Street were vacated. The council decided to convert the former school buildings to become its headquarters, using the nearby offices in India Street as additional accommodation. The remodelled school and offices were formally opened by Elizabeth II on 2 November 1979, when the whole complex was renamed "Strathclyde House".

Despite the singular name, Strathclyde House was in fact eleven main buildings, which were distinguished from each other as "Strathclyde House 1", "Strathclyde House 2" and so on:

Blocks 5 to 9 at the old school site are all Category A listed buildings. The council also had other offices nearby, including Dalian House, on the corner of St Vincent Street and North Street.

Following the implementation of the Local Government etc. (Scotland) Act 1994, Strathclyde Regional Council was abolished in 1996. Blocks 3, 4 and 11 were all sold soon after the council's abolition for redevelopment. Blocks 1 and 2 were together renamed Nye Bevan House to recall the life of the Labour Party politician, Nye Bevan. That building was eventually demolished in 2015.

Blocks 5 to 10 at the old High School site were used by Glasgow City Council after 1996 as additional office space. The council chamber there was briefly used in 2000 by the Scottish Parliament, with its new permanent home at Holyrood under construction and the temporary buildings in Edinburgh booked out. Glasgow City Council sold the old High School buildings in 2010 but a new use has yet to be found for them.

References

Buildings and structures in Glasgow
Government buildings completed in 1974
Buildings and structures demolished in 2015